The Graduate School of Arts and Sciences (also known as GSAS) is the graduate school of Columbia University. Founded in 1880, GSAS is responsible for most of Columbia's graduate degree programs in the humanities, social sciences, and natural sciences. The school offers MA and PhD degrees in approximately 78 disciplines.

History

GSAS began to take shape in the late 19th century, when Columbia, until then a primarily undergraduate institution with a few professional attachments, began to establish graduate faculties in several fields: Political Science (1880), Philosophy (1890), and Pure Science (1892). The graduate faculties, notably, were open to women at a time when many other Columbia schools were not; Columbia College did not become a coeducational institution until 1983. The first Ph.D. awarded by Columbia was conferred in 1882; the first woman to receive one did so in 1886.

The increasing professionalization of the university brought with it an emphasis on the graduate schools, as presidents such as Seth Low and Nicholas Murray Butler sought to emulate the success of German universities during the late 19th and early 20th centuries. Indeed, in the effort to produce as many graduate degree-holders as possible, attempts were made to streamline undergraduate life and center academic life in the graduate-focused departments. Such efforts led to resistance among Columbia College administrators and undergraduates, arguably one of the contributing factors in the 1968 protests. Nevertheless, graduate research has flourished at Columbia as a result, and the university has been among the top producers of PhDs in the United States from the inception of the graduate disciplines. In the early 1990s, GSAS and Columbia College faculty were all absorbed into a consolidated Faculty of Arts and Sciences, with familiar complaints among undergraduates and their advocates.

List of academic departments

African-American Studies
African Studies Certificate
American Studies (Liberal Studies M.A.)
Anatomy and Cell Biology
Anthropology (Ph.D in Anthropology & Education - joint degree with Teachers College)
Applied Mathematics
Applied Physics and Applied Mathematics
Architecture (History and Theory)
Art History and Archaeology
Astronomy
Atmospheric and Planetary Science
Biochemistry and Molecular Biophysics
Biological Sciences
Biomedical Engineering
Biomedical Informatics
Biostatistics
Biotechnology
Buddhist Studies
Business
Cell Biology and Pathobiology
Cellular, Molecular, and Biophysical Studies
Chemical Biology
Chemical Engineering
Chemical Physics
Chemistry
Civil Engineering and Engineering Mechanics
Classical Studies
Classics
Climate and Society
Communications
Comparative Literature and Society
Computer Science
Conservation Biology
Dental Sciences
Earth and Environmental Engineering (Henry Krumb School of Mines)
Earth and Environmental Science Journalism
Earth and Environmental Sciences
East Asia: Regional Studies
East Asian Languages and Cultures
East Asian Studies (Liberal Studies M.A.)
Ecology, Evolution, and Environmental Biology
Economics
Education (Teachers College)
Electrical Engineering
English and Comparative Literature
Environmental Health Sciences
Epidemiology
French and Romance Philology
French Cultural Studies in a Global Context
Genetics and Development
Germanic Languages
Global Thought
History
Human Rights
Human Rights Studies
Industrial Engineering & Operations Research
International and World History, Dual Degree M.A./M.Sc.
Islamic Studies (Liberal Studies M.A.)
Italian Studies
J.D./Ph.D. Program
Japanese Pedagogy
Jewish Studies
Jewish Studies (Liberal Studies M.A.)
Journalism
Latin America and Caribbean; Regional Studies
Linguistics
M.D./Ph.D.
Materials Science and Engineering/Solid State Science and Engineering
Mathematical Structures for Environmental & Social Sciences
Mathematics
Mathematics of Finance
Mechanical Engineering
Medieval and Renaissance Studies
Medieval Studies (Liberal Studies M.A.)
Microbiology
Middle Eastern, South Asian, and African Studies
Middle East Studies, Certificate
Modern Art, Critical, and Curatorial Studies
Modern European Studies (Liberal Studies M.A.)
Museum Anthropology
Music
Neurobiology and Behavior
Nutrition
Operations Research
Oral History
Pathology and Cell Biology
Pharmacology
Philosophical Foundations of Physics
Philosophy
Physics
Physiology and Cellular Biophysics
Political Science
Psychology
Quantitative Methods in the Social Sciences
Quantitative Methods in the Social Sciences, dual degree MA/MPA
Religion
Religion-Journalism Dual MA/MS
Russia, Eurasia and East Europe: Regional Studies M.A. Program
Russian Translation
Slavic Cultures
Slavic Languages
Social Work
Sociology
Sociomedical Sciences
South Asian Studies (Liberal Studies M.A.)
Spanish and Portuguese
Statistics
Sustainable Development
Theatre and Performance
Urban Planning
Yiddish Studies

Notable alumni

Economists

Kenneth Arrow – economist, Ph.D., 1951
Arthur Burns – economist, Ph.D., 1934
Milton Friedman – economist, Ph.D., 1946
Christina Paxson – economist; Dean of the Woodrow Wilson School at Princeton University; 19th President, Brown University, PhD 1987

Historians

Nina Ansary – historian, Ph.D 2013
Jacques Barzun – historian, Ph.D. 1932
Charles A. Beard – historian, Ph.D. 1904
Dominique Collon - historian, Ph.D 1971
Lawrence Cremin – historian, M.A. 1947, Ph.D. 1949
Richard Hofstadter – historian, Ph.D. 1942
Bruce Cumings – historian, Ph.D. 1975
Stanley Payne—historian, Ph.D. 1959
Howard Zinn—historian, Ph.D. 1958

Literature

Jacob M. Appel – writer and bioethicist, M.A., 2000
John Ashbery – poet, 1951
Isaac Asimov – science fiction writer, M.A. 1941
Paul Auster – writer, M.A., 1970
Randolph Bourne – antiwar essayist, M.A. 1913
Rachel Blau DuPlessis – literary critic, M.A. 1964, Ph.D. 1970
Teju Cole - novelist and critic, M.Phil. art history, 2003
John Eisenhower - military historian and son of Dwight D. Eisenhower, M.A., 1950
Jason Epstein – writer, M.A., 1950
John Erskine – literary scholar, Ph.D. 1903
James Goldman – writer, 1952
William Goldman – screenwriter, 1956
Naomi Foner Gyllenhaal – screenwriter
David G. Hartwell - critic and editor, Ph.D. 1973
Carolyn Heilbrun – writer, M.A. 1951, Ph.D. 1959
Joseph Heller – writer, 1949
Zora Neale Hurston – writer, 1935
Alfred Kazin – literary critic, 1958
Kenneth Koch – poet, M.A. 1953, Ph.D. 1959
Joseph Wood Krutch – writer, M.A. 1916, Ph.D. 1929
David Lehman – poet, Ph.D. 1978
Peter Straub – writer, 1966
Lionel Trilling – literary critic, M.A. 1926, Ph.D. 1938
Anne Tyler – novelist, 1962
Mark Van Doren – writer, Ph.D. 1920
Stark Young – critic and writer, 1902

Philosophers

Mortimer Adler – Ph.D. in psychology, 1928
Arthur Danto – M.A. 1949, Ph.D. in philosophy, 1952
Irwin Edman – Ph.D. in philosophy, 1919
Hu Shih – public intellectual in China, Ph.D. 1917

Natural scientists

Jacqueline Barton – chemist, 1979
Niles Eldredge – paleontologist, Ph.D. 1969
Stephen Jay Gould – paleontologist, Ph.D. 1967
Neil deGrasse Tyson – astrophysicist, author, science communicator, Ph.D. 1991

Performing arts

 Kenneth Ascher, DMA – jazz pianist, composer – 1966 CC; 1968 GSAS; 1971 SOA
 Alan Heyman, traditional Korean musicologist and composer, 1959
 Art Garfunkel – musician, 1967
 Will Geer – actor
 Edward Everett Horton – actor, 1909
 John Kander – composer, 1954
 Bernard Malamud – writer, 1942
 Thomas Merton – Catholic writer, 1939

Social scientists

Ruth Benedict – anthropologist, Ph.D. 1923
Theos Casimir Bernard – explorer and religionist, M.A. 1936, Ph.D. 1943
Kenneth B. Clark – educational psychologist, Ph.D. 1940
Mamie Phipps Clark – educational psychologist, Ph.D. 1943
Gilberto Freyre — Brazilian sociologist, cultural anthropologist and historian, M.A. 1922
Robert A. Leonard — linguist, M.A. and M. Phil. 1973, Ph.D 1982
Margaret Mead — anthropologist, Ph.D. 1929
Lorine Livingston Pruette — psychologist, Ph.D. 1924

Politicians

B. R. Ambedkar – a founding father of India, M.A. 1915, Ph.D. 1928
Nicholas Murray Butler – diplomat and President of Columbia University, Ph.D. 1884
Benjamin Cardozo – jurist, M.A. 1890
Wellington Koo – Chinese diplomat, Ph.D. 1912
Robert Moses urban planner, Ph.D. 1914
Frances Perkins – US Secretary of Labor, M.A. 1910
Brent Scowcroft – US National Security Advisor, M.A. and Ph.D. in international relations, 1967
Mark Wyland – California State Senator, M.A. in political science, 1969
Madeleine Albright - Secretary of State, Ph.D. in public law and governance, 1976

Visual arts
Mary Godfrey – art educator
Donald Clarence Judd – sculptor, 1961
Agnes Martin – painter, M.A. 1952
Jerome J. Pollitt – art historian, Ph.D. 1963
Meyer Schapiro – art historian, Ph.D. 1929

Other fields

Peter Buck – founder of Subway restaurant chain, Ph.D. 
Herman Hollerith – inventor, Ph.D. 1890
Jose Franklin Jurado-Rodriguez – Moneylaunderer for the Cali Cartel kingpin Jose Santacruz Londono
Sam Levenson – comedian, 1938
Ge Li – Chinese American billionaire, co-founder of WuXi AppTec, Ph.D. 1994
John McCaffery – newscaster
Richard P. Mills – former Commissioner of Education for both Vermont and New York States, M.A. 1967
Madeleine B. Stern – rare book expert, M.A. 1934
Judith Rodin – 7th president of the University of Pennsylvania and president of the Rockefeller Foundation, Ph.D. 1970
Sol M. Stroock – lawyer, M.A. 1892
Leonard Tow – Chairman and CEO of Citizens Communications, Ph.D. 1960
James T. Lee - lawyer, banker, real estate developer, and grandfather of Jacqueline Kennedy Onassis and Lee Radziwill, A.M. 1902
Peter Hildebrand Meienberg – Swiss Benedictine missionary based in East Africa

References

External links
 GSAS website

 
Columbia University
Educational institutions established in 1880
1880 establishments in New York (state)
Liberal arts colleges at universities in the United States